Boffalora may refer to:

 Boffalora d'Adda, municipality in the Province of Lodi in the Italian region Lombardy
 Boffalora sopra Ticino, municipality in the Metropolitan City of Milan in the Italian region Lombardy